Vitis heyneana is a species of climbing vine in the grape family endemic to Asia. It can be found in shrubby or forested areas, from almost sea-level, to 3200 meters above. It has globose berries (10–13 mm diam.) that are purple to almost black.

Subspecies 
Vitis heyneana is known by its two subspecies: V. h. subsp. heyneana (autonym), and V. h. subsp. ficifolia. In Chinese, the former is called mao pu tao, meaning wool grape; it has leaves that range in shape from oval, ovate-oblong, to ovate-quinquangular. The latter subspecies is called sang ye pu tao, or mulberry-leaf grape, and its leaves are usually trilobate to cleft (a few leaves interspersed on a vine will be undivided). However, V. h. subsp. ficifolia may be a homotypic synonym of Vitis ficifolia Bunge, as the same type was used for both.

Other notable differences exist as well:

Respective ranges and altitude tolerance 
V. heyneana subsp. ficifolia shares territory with V. h. subsp. heyneana in the Chinese provinces of Henan, Shaanxi, Shandong, and Shanxi; and it alone occupies Hebei and Jiangsu; but of the two subspecies, V. h. subsp. heyneana has by far the wider range; in addition to those already mentioned, V. h. subsp. heyneana
is found in the provinces of Anhui, Chongqing, Fujian, Gansu, Guangdong, Guangxi, Guizhou, Hubei, Hunan, Jiangxi, Sichuan, Xizang, Yunnan, and Zhejiang), as well as the countries India, Bhutan, and Nepal.

The success of V. h. subsp. heyneana in multiplying itself in so many places, in contrast to the relatively limited range V. h. subsp. ficifolia correlates similarly with how well it manages to survive at higher altitudes

V. h. subsp. heyneana : 100–3200 meters above sea-level
V. h. subsp. ficifolia : 100–1300 meters above sea-level

Respective times of bloom and fruition 
Comparing the two, V. h. subsp. heyneana has periods of bloom and fruiting longer than those of V. h. subsp. ficifolia —
Flowering months :
V. h. subsp. heyneana : April - June or July
V. h. subsp. ficifolia : May - July
Fruiting months :
V. h. subsp. heyneana : June - October
V. h. subsp. ficifolia : July - September

References

External links
 Detailed b/w illustration from Flora of China

heyneana
Plants described in 1819
Flora of Anhui
Flora of Chongqing
Flora of Fujian
Flora of Gansu
Flora of Guangdong
Flora of Guangxi
Flora of Guizhou
Flora of Hebei
Flora of Henan
Flora of Hubei
Flora of Hunan
Flora of Jiangsu
Flora of Jiangxi
Flora of Shaanxi
Flora of Shandong
Flora of Shanxi
Flora of Sichuan
Flora of Tibet
Flora of Yunnan
Flora of Zhejiang
Flora of East Himalaya
Flora of Nepal